Mishal Al-Ali (born 5 July 1968) is a Kuwaiti handball player. He competed in the 1996 Summer Olympics.

References

External links
 

1968 births
Living people
Handball players at the 1996 Summer Olympics
Kuwaiti male handball players
Olympic handball players of Kuwait